Shaheed Bhagat Singh College is a co-educational institute which was established in 1967. It is a constituent college of the University of Delhi. The college is named after Shaheed Bhagat Singh, an Indian freedom fighter who believed strongly in social justice. It has been accredited with A Grade with 3.26 NAAC.

Campus

The college is a part of the South Campus and is located at Sheikh Sarai Phase II. The college has a computerized library, which contains a huge collection of books from all over the world. The College has multiple computer labs, geography lab, math lab. The college has arrangements for various sports and games like cricket, hockey, football, volleyball, basketball, lawn tennis, table tennis, badminton, kho-kho, athletics, gymnastics, carrom and chess.

Governance
Prof. Arun Kumar Attree is the Principal of the college.

Academics

Academic programmes
The college offers both Graduate Degrees and Postgraduate Degrees. At the undergraduate level it offers 3 Year degrees in Commerce, B.A. Programme, English, Economics, Hindi, History, Geography, Political Science and Mathematics. At the postgraduate level, it offers an M.Com degree.

Learning methods are supported by lectures, seminars, workshops and presentations and conferences. All this is usually supported by project work, case studies, field work, educational tours and career oriented programmes.

Rankings
University Express ranked it at number 5 among all the Delhi university colleges, giving its faculty a full 10/10 score.

Grants and scholarships

The college offers grants and scholarships to several deserving students.

Notable alumni

Bhuvan Bam, Actor ,internet personality, youtuber
Ramesh Bidhuri, Politician
Anil Devgan, filmmaker, screenwriter
Anupriya Goenka, actress
Sidharth Malhotra, actor
Harshvardhan Rane, actor
Gautam Rode, actor
Shoojit Sircar, film director

References 

Universities and colleges in Delhi
Economics schools in India
Educational institutions established in 1967
Delhi University
Commerce colleges in India
Memorials to Bhagat Singh
1967 establishments in Delhi